Gerald Klews (born 4 April 1972) is a German former footballer.

Career

Klews began his career at youth level with various clubs in West Berlin, before joining Hamburger SV, where he played for the reserve team. He returned to Berlin in 1992, joining Hertha BSC, where he made 57 appearances in the 2. Bundesliga over three years, mostly as a substitute. In his first season, he was also involved in Hertha's reserve team, who reached the DFB-Pokal final, losing 1–0 to Bayer Leverkusen.

In 1995, Klews moved across town, to join Union Berlin, playing in the Regionalliga Nordost for two years, before returning to the second level in 1997, joining Energie Cottbus. He was a regular in the first team in his first year, but only made two appearances in the first half of the following season, and left in January 1999, joining SV Babelsberg. After six months, he moved west, spending a year at each VfB Oldenburg and Holstein Kiel. He ended his career with spells at various clubs in the northeastern region.

References

External links

Gerald Klews at immerunioner.de 

1972 births
Living people
German footballers
Association football fullbacks
Hamburger SV II players
Hertha BSC II players
Hertha BSC players
1. FC Union Berlin players
FC Energie Cottbus players
SV Babelsberg 03 players
VfB Oldenburg players
Holstein Kiel players
VfL Halle 1896 players
2. Bundesliga players
Place of birth missing (living people)
West German footballers